13th NSFC Awards
January 4, 1979

Best Film: 
 Get Out Your Handkerchiefs 
The 13th National Society of Film Critics Awards, given on 4 January 1979, honored the best filmmaking of 1978.

Winners

Best Picture 
1. Get Out Your Handkerchiefs (Préparez vos mouchoirs)
2. The Deer Hunter
2. An Unmarried Woman
4. Days of Heaven

Best Director 
1. Terrence Malick – Days of Heaven
2. Bertrand Blier – Get Out Your Handkerchiefs (Préparez vos mouchoirs)
3. Michael Cimino – The Deer Hunter

Best Actor 
1. Gary Busey – The Buddy Holly Story
2. Jon Voight – Coming Home
3. Nick Nolte – Who'll Stop the Rain
4. Michael Caine – California Suite
5. Robert De Niro – The Deer Hunter

Best Actress 
1. Ingrid Bergman – Autumn Sonata (Höstsonaten)
2. Jane Fonda – Coming Home, Comes a Horseman and California Suite
3. Jill Clayburgh – An Unmarried Woman
4. Maggie Smith – California Suite

Best Supporting Actor 
1. Richard Farnsworth – Comes a Horseman
1. Robert Morley – Who Is Killing the Great Chefs of Europe?
3. Christopher Walken – The Deer Hunter
4. Barry Bostwick – Movie Movie

Best Supporting Actress 
1. Meryl Streep – The Deer Hunter
2. Maureen Stapleton – Interiors
3. Maggie Smith – California Suite

Best Screenplay 
1. Paul Mazursky – An Unmarried Woman
2. Bertrand Blier – Get Out Your Handkerchiefs (Préparez vos mouchoirs)
3. Larry Gelbart and Sheldon Keller – Movie Movie
4. W.D. Richter – Invasion of the Body Snatchers
5. Woody Allen – Interiors

Best Cinematography 
Néstor Almendros – Days of Heaven

Special Citation 
The Battle of Chile (La batalla de Chile)

References

External links
Past Awards

1978
National Society of Film Critics Awards
National Society of Film Critics Awards
National Society of Film Critics Awards